Gouku or Gōki or Gooki may refer to:
Gōki Maeda, a Japanese actor
Akuma (Street Fighter), a character in the Street Fighter video game series known as Gouki in the Japanese versions
Gouki (Beyblade), a character in Beyblade media
Kamen Rider Gouki, a character in the television series Kamen Rider Hibiki
Gooki, Iran, a village in Fars Province, Iran
GingaBlue, a character in the television series Seijuu Sentai Gingaman whose real identity is Gouki

Japanese masculine given names